Dampremy is a town of Wallonia and district of the municipality of Charleroi, located in the province of Hainaut, Belgium.  

It was a municipality of its own before the fusion of the Belgian municipalities in 1977. 

Sub-municipalities of Charleroi
Former municipalities of Hainaut (province)